Blanquefort may refer to:

 Blanquefort, Gers, a commune in the Gers department in south-western France
 Blanquefort, Gironde, an outlying commune of the Bordeaux agglomeration

See also
 Blanquefort-sur-Briolance, in Lot-et-Garonne